Gila Community College (GCC) is the community college serving the Gila Community College District in Gila County, Arizona.   It has three campuses:
 Gila Pueblo Campus, Globe, Arizona
 Payson Campus, Payson, Arizona
 San Carlos Campus, San Carlos, Arizona

GCC currently has the status of a "provisional college".  It operates under an accreditation contract with Eastern Arizona College, the community college of neighboring Graham County, Arizona.  It is currently beginning efforts to become an independent, accredited community college in its own right.

References

External links
 Gila Community College Web Site

Community colleges in Arizona
Education in Gila County, Arizona
Educational institutions in the United States with year of establishment missing